Listed below are the dates and results for the 2002 FIFA World Cup qualification rounds for the South American zone (CONMEBOL). For an overview of the qualification rounds, see the article 2002 FIFA World Cup qualification.

A total of 10 CONMEBOL teams entered the competition. The South American zone was allocated 4.5 places (out of 32) in the final tournament.

The 10 teams played against each other on a home-and-away basis. The top 4 teams qualified. The 5th-placed team advanced to the CONMEBOL / OFC Intercontinental Play-off.

Final standings

Matches

Matchday 1

Matchday 2

Matchday 3

Matchday 4

Matchday 5

Matchday 6

Matchday 7

Matchday 8

Matchday 9

Matchday 10

Matchday 11

Matchday 12

Matchday 13

Matchday 14

Matchday 15

Matchday 16

Matchday 17

Matchday 18

Intercontinental play-off

Qualified teams
The following five teams from CONMEBOL qualified for the final tournament.

1 Bold indicates champions for that year. Italic indicates hosts for that year.

Goalscorers
There were 235 goals scored in 92 matches (including 2 international play-offs), for an average of 2.55 goals per match.
9 goals

 Hernán Crespo
 Agustín Delgado

8 goals

 Rivaldo
 Romário

6 goals

 Julio César Baldivieso
 José Cardozo
 Darío Silva

5 goals

 Gabriel Batistuta
 Claudio López
 Juan Sebastián Verón
 Carlos Humberto Paredes

4 goals

 Marcelo Salas
 Iván Zamorano
 Juan Pablo Ángel
 José Luis Chilavert
 Nicolás Olivera
 Ruberth Morán

3 goals

 Marcelo Gallardo
 Ariel Ortega
 Joaquín Botero
 Líder Paz
 Víctor Aristizábal
 Jairo Castillo
 Iván Kaviedes
 Roque Santa Cruz
 Federico Magallanes

2 goals

 Walter Samuel
 Juan Pablo Sorín
 Roger Suárez
 Edílson
 Luizão
 Vampeta
 Antônio Carlos Zago
 Álex Aguinaga
 Ulises de la Cruz
 Hugo Brizuela
 Juan Pajuelo
 Roberto Palacios
 Claudio Pizarro
 Nolberto Solano
 Richard Morales
 Wilfredo Alvarado
 Juan Arango
 Daniel Noriega
 Alexander Rondón

1 goal

 Pablo Aimar
 Matias Almeyda
 Roberto Ayala
 Kily González
 Claudio Husaín
 Gustavo Adrián López
 Mauricio Pochettino
 José Alfredo Castillo
 Milton Coimbra
 Percy Colque
 Gonzalo Galindo
 Raúl Justiniano
 Jaime Moreno
 Erwin Sánchez
 Alexsandro de Souza
 Euller
 Juninho Paulista
 Marcelinho Paraíba
 Roque Júnior
 Fabián Estay
 Javier Margas
 Reinaldo Navia
 Jaime Riveros
 Héctor Tapia
 Rodrigo Tello
 Gerardo Bedoya
 Víctor Bonilla
 Rafael Arlex Castillo
 Iván Córdoba
 Jersson González
 Freddy Grisales
 Frankie Oviedo
 Iván Valenciano
 Arnulfo Valentierra
 Alexander Viveros
 Cléber Chalá
 Ángel Fernández
 Luis Gómez
 Ariel Graziani
 Eduardo Hurtado
 Édison Méndez
 Wellington Sánchez
 Roberto Acuña
 Francisco Arce
 Celso Ayala
 Jorge Luis Campos
 Gabriel González
 Gustavo Morínigo
 Delio Toledo
 Guido Alvarenga
 Piero Alva
 Pedro Alejandro García
 Juan José Jayo
 Flavio Maestri
 Andrés Mendoza
 Gabriel Cedrés
 Pablo Gabriel García
 Paolo Montero
 Álvaro Recoba
 Darío Rodríguez
 Juan Enrique García
 Héctor Gonzalez
 Miguel Mea Vitali
 Ricardo Páez
 Giovanni Savarese
 Edson Tortolero

1 own goal

 Walter Samuel (against Peru)
 Cris (against Argentina)
 Ítalo Díaz (against Uruguay)
 Marco Antonio Sandy (against Brazil)
 Denis Caniza (against Chile)
 José del Solar (against Paraguay)

2 own goals

 Roberto Ayala (against Uruguay and Brazil)

Notes 
This was the first and, to date, only time that Brazil lost more than 2 matches and has not finished as leader (1st) of their qualifying group, during a FIFA World Cup qualification.

See also 
 2014 FIFA World Cup qualification (CONMEBOL)
 2010 FIFA World Cup qualification (CONMEBOL)
 2006 FIFA World Cup qualification (CONMEBOL)
 1998 FIFA World Cup qualification (CONMEBOL)

CONMEBOL
FIFA World Cup qualification (CONMEBOL)
World
World

fr:Tours préliminaires à la Coupe du monde de football 2002#Amérique du Sud
lt:XVII pasaulio futbolo čempionato atranka#Pietų Amerika